Vítězslav "Slava" Ďuriš (born January 5, 1954) is a Czechoslovakian former professional ice hockey defenceman. He began his career with Skoda Plzen in the Czechoslovak First Ice Hockey League, where he played from 1975 to 1980. He then played 89 games in the National Hockey League with the Toronto Maple Leafs during the 1980–81 and 1982–83 seasons. Ďuriš returned to Europe and played in the German Eishockey-Bundesliga from 1983 until 1991. Internationally Ďuriš played for the Czechoslovakian national team at the 1979 World Championships, winning a silver medal, and the 1980 Winter Olympics.

Career statistics

Regular season and playoffs

International

External links
 

1954 births
Living people
Cincinnati Tigers players
Czech ice hockey defencemen
Czechoslovak ice hockey defencemen
EHC Freiburg players
EV Landshut players
HC Dukla Jihlava players
HC Plzeň players
Ice hockey players at the 1980 Winter Olympics
Iserlohn Roosters players
Olympic ice hockey players of Czechoslovakia
Sportspeople from Karviná
Toronto Maple Leafs players
Undrafted National Hockey League players
Czechoslovak expatriate sportspeople in the United States
Czechoslovak expatriate sportspeople in Canada
Czechoslovak expatriate sportspeople in West Germany
Czechoslovak expatriate ice hockey people
Expatriate ice hockey players in the United States
Expatriate ice hockey players in Canada
Expatriate ice hockey players in West Germany
Czechoslovakia (WHA) players